Events in the year 1931 in Portugal.

Incumbents
President: Óscar Carmona 
Prime Minister: Domingos Oliveira

Events
Madeira uprising
 Establishment of Avante!

Culture

Films
 Douro, Faina Fluvial
 A Severa

Sport
 Establishment of C.D. Arrifanense
 Establishment of F.C. Famalicão

Births
 16 February - Paulo Alexandre, singer
 8 March - Pires, footballer 
 5 July - António de Macedo, filmmaker, writer, university professor, lecturer
 1 August - Isabel de Castro, actress (died 2005)
 13 September - Mário Torres, footballer
 15 September - José Pereira, footballer

Deaths
 24 August - Henrique Lopes de Mendonça, poet, playwright, naval officer (born 1856)

References

 
Portugal
Years of the 20th century in Portugal
Portugal